The men's 5000 metres race of the 2014–15 ISU Speed Skating World Cup 3, arranged in Sportforum Hohenschönhausen, in Berlin, Germany, was held on 6 December 2014.

Jorrit Bergsma of the Netherlands won, followed by Sverre Lunde Pedersen of Norway in second place, and Douwe de Vries of the Netherlands in third place. Frank Vreugdenhil of the Netherlands won Division B.

Results
The race took place on Saturday, 6 December, with both divisions in scheduled in the afternoon session, Division A at 14:13, and Division B at 17:00.

Division A

Division B

References

Men 5000
3